Critical Care is an online open access peer-reviewed medical journal covering intensive-care medicine. The founding editor and the current editor-in-chief is Jean-Louis Vincent of the Université Libre de Bruxelles. Critical Care was established in 1997 and is currently published by BioMed Central.

Abstracting and Indexing 
The journal is abstracted and indexed in:
 Biological Abstracts
 CABI
 Citebase
 Chemical Abstracts Service
 CINAHL
 Current Contents: Clinical Medicine
 DOAJ
 Embase
 EmCare
 Global Health
 MEDLINE/PubMed
 Medscape
 Nutrition & Food Sciences Database 
 Nutrition Abstracts & Reviews Series A: Human & Experimental
 OAIster
 Science Citation Index Expanded
 Tropical Diseases Bulletin
 SCImago
 SOCOLAR
 SCOPUS
 Web of Science
 Zetoc

According to the Journal Citation Reports, the journal has a 2020 impact factor of 9.097, ranking it 7 out of 82 journals in the category ‘Critical Care and Intensive Care Medicine’.

References

External links
 

Publications established in 1997
BioMed Central academic journals
General medical journals
Bimonthly journals
English-language journals
Creative Commons Attribution-licensed journals
Online-only journals